The Tomoka River is a north-flowing river in Volusia County, Florida, United States.

Geography 
The river then flows north-northeast, passing through the cities of Daytona Beach and Ormond Beach until it empties into the Halifax River. Near its mouth the river passes through the Tomoka Marsh Aquatic Preserve and Tomoka State Park. It also runs next to the Ormond Beach Municipal Airport and Addison Blockhouse Historic State Park.

Manatee sanctuary
The river and several of its tributaries (Strickland, Thompson and Dodson Creek) are designated as a manatee sanctuary. Other threatened species that inhabit the river basin include the wood stork and Atlantic salt marsh snake. The bald eagle can also be found in and around the river basin.

Paddling trail
The Florida Department of Environmental Protection recommends this paddling trail for beginners.

List of crossings

See also 

 Daytona Beach, Florida
 Ormond Beach, Florida
 Tomoka State Park

References

External links 

 Tomoka State Park
 Tomoka Marsh Aquatic Preserve
 Tomoka River Canoe Trail
 Florida DEP: Florida's Upper East Coast Watershed

Rivers of Florida
Rivers of Volusia County, Florida
Outstanding Florida Waters